Allan Góes (born April 20, 1971) is a retired Brazilian mixed martial artist. He last fought for the Seattle Tiger Sharks of the International Fight League.

Biography
Goes started practicing Brazilian jiu-jitsu at the age of 7 in Rio de Janeiro, Brazil with his grandfather Alcides Goes, judo master. When he was 12 he was taken to the Carlson Gracie Team and fell in love with the sport embracing jiu-jitsu as a profession, totally dedicating himself to the "Gentle Art". He also trained kickboxing, and got a black belt in judo.

At the age of 18, he got his black belt from the hands of Carlson Gracie. At 19, after more than 200 Jiu-Jitsu fights and only one loss, and achieving World Brazilian Jiu-Jitsu Champion 8 times he then moved to the United States to become a professional MMA Fighter. In the year of 2000, Góes helped create a new team with his old team partners, called Brazilian Top Team.

Góes had his MMA debut for Japanese Pancrase promotion, taking on Frank Shamrock in 1995. Allan scored the first takedown, which Frank followed with one of his own, but the Brazilian threatened him twice with Kimura attempts from the bottom and also threw ground and pound after taking from top position. The shoot wrestler answered sweeping him and clamping an ankle lock, but Góes reversed into a rear naked choke. It marked a controversial instance, as Góes refused to release the hold when Frank utilized a rope escape as by Pancrase's rules, and he gained a yellow card from the referee; moreover, according to Shamrock, Góes eye-gouged him without the referee noticing in order to secure the choke. As the match continued, Shamrock continued utilizing ankle locks and heel hooks, badly dislocating Góes's ankle and making him spend his own rope escape. The Brazilian ended the match taking Frank's back, but the bout was ruled a draw by points.

Allan followed his debut participating in several MMA events in United States from 1995 to 1997, beating Anthony Macias by TKO and submitting Todd Bjornethun by triangle choke. He entered Ultimate Fighting Championship in its UFC 17 tournament in an attempt to challenge for the UFC Light Heavyweight Championship held by Frank Shamrock, firstly facing fellow challenger Dan Henderson.

The Brazilian opened the match dropping Henderson down with a punch, but Henderson countered with a heel hook attempt, and later started landing effective ground and pound through Góes's guard, bloodying his nose. The match ended with Henderson scoring several punches at the overtime, gaining a unanimous decision over the Brazilian fighter. However, controversy arose about the end of the main round, when the referee John McCarthy stopped Góes from locking a rear naked choke after an illegal kick to a downed Henderson. Góes went to claim in an interview that Henderson was passing out in his hold when the referee broke it, and protested about the application of the rules.

After his UFC tenure, Góes went to compete in Japan again, for PRIDE Fighting Championships, and had his debut against Kazushi Sakuraba. The Brazilian lied on the ground for most of the match, but made an excellent usage of defensive guard, throwing upkicks and threatening with submissions attempts. Góes fended away the aggressor Sakuraba and took his back several times, seeking for rear naked chokes, but he was not successful, and almost got caught in an armbar at the second round. The final round saw Góes taking dominant position and being near of another choke, as well as trading kicks with Sakuraba from the ground. As the rules didn't involve judge decisions, the match was ruled a draw.

Another of Góes's highest profiled matches in PRIDE was against Hammer House founder Mark Coleman in 2001. Outweighed by 30 pounds, Góes first tried a capoeira spinning kick before shooting for the takedown, but Coleman stopped him and landed two knee strikes, the second of which knocked Góes off, before throwing three more for the referee stoppage. Some seconds after the decision, believing (under the effects of the KO) that the match was still running, Góes attacked Coleman and caused a brawl, but it was cleared off and they left in friendly terms.

Today, Black Belt Master 7th Dan, Allan Goes is known as one of the most technical fighters and has created his own system to teach Jiu-Jitsu. Goes teaches at his Gym, TUVA Jiu Jitsu, in Laguna Niguel, California.

Mixed martial arts record

|-
| Loss
| align=center| 10–5–2
| Alex Schoenauer
| KO (punch)
| IFL: Everett
| 
| align=center| 1
| align=center| 3:00
| Everett, Washington, United States
| 
|-
| Win
| align=center| 10–4–2
| Homer Moore
| TKO (punches)
| IFL: Moline
| 
| align=center| 2
| align=center| 2:56
| Moline, Illinois, United States
| 
|-
| Win
| align=center| 9–4–2
| Daniel Gracie
| TKO (punches)
| IFL: World Championship Semifinals
| 
| align=center| 2
| align=center| 1:03
| Portland, Oregon, United States
| 
|-
| Win
| align=center| 8–4–2
| Devin Cole
| Submission (guillotine choke)
| IFL: Portland
| 
| align=center| 1
| align=center| 2:05
| Portland, Oregon, United States
| 
|-
| Win
| align=center| 7–4–2
| Chris West
| Submission (kneebar)
| Rumble on the Rock 7
| 
| align=center| 1
| align=center| 0:41
| Honolulu, Hawaii, United States
| 
|-
| Loss
| align=center| 6–4–2
| Gustavo Machado
| TKO (retirement)
| Heat FC 2: Evolution
| 
| align=center| 1
| align=center| N/A
| Natal, Brazil
| 
|-
| Win
| align=center| 6–3–2
| Carlos Lima
| Submission (armbar)
| Meca 8: Meca World Vale Tudo 8
| 
| align=center| 1
| align=center| 7:50
| Curitiba, Brazil
| 
|-
| Loss
| align=center| 5–3–2
| Alex Stiebling
| TKO (knees and punches)
| PRIDE 18
| 
| align=center| 3
| align=center| 0:47
| Fukuoka, United States
| 
|-
| Loss
| align=center| 5–2–2
| Mark Coleman
| KO (knees)
| PRIDE 13
| 
| align=center| 1
| align=center| 1:19
| Saitama, Japan
| 
|-
| Win
| align=center| 5–1–2
| Vernon White
| Decision (unanimous)
| PRIDE 9 
| 
| align=center| 2
| align=center| 10:00
| Nagoya, Japan
| 
|-
| Win
| align=center| 4–1–2
| Carl Malenko
| Submission (arm-triangle choke)
| PRIDE 8
| 
| align=center| 1
| align=center| 9:16
| Tokyo, Japan
| 
|-
|  Draw
| align=center| 3–1–2
| Kazushi Sakuraba
| Draw
| PRIDE 4
| 
| align=center| 3
| align=center| 10:00
| Tokyo, Japan
| 
|-
| Loss
| align=center| 3–1–1
| Dan Henderson
| Decision (unanimous)
| UFC 17 
| 
| align=center| 1
| align=center| 15:00
| Mobile, Alabama, United States
| 
|-
| Win
| align=center| 3–0–1
| Todd Bjornethun
| Submission (triangle choke)
| EF 4: Extreme Fighting 4
| 
| align=center| 1
| align=center| 0:30
| Des Moines, Iowa, United States
| 
|-
| Win
| align=center| 2–0–1
| Matt Andersen
| Submission (triangle choke)
| EC 3: Extreme Challenge 3
| 
| align=center| 1
| align=center| 5:59
| Davenport, Iowa, United States
| 
|-
| Win
| align=center| 1–0–1
| Anthony Macias
| TKO (submission to punches)
| EF 3: Extreme Fighting 3
| 
| align=center| 1
| align=center| 3:52
| Tulsa, Oklahoma, United States
| 
|-
|  Draw
| align=center| 0-0-1
| Frank Shamrock
| Draw 
| Pancrase: Eyes Of Beast 4
| 
| align=center| 1
| align=center| 10:00
| Urayasu, Japan
|

References

External links
 
 
 
 Allan Goes at IFL (archived)

1971 births
Living people
Brazilian male mixed martial artists
Light heavyweight mixed martial artists
Mixed martial artists utilizing judo
Mixed martial artists utilizing Brazilian jiu-jitsu
Brazilian practitioners of Brazilian jiu-jitsu
People awarded a black belt in Brazilian jiu-jitsu
Brazilian male judoka
Brazilian expatriate sportspeople in the United States
Sportspeople from Mission Viejo, California
Sportspeople from Rio de Janeiro (city)
People from Laguna Niguel, California
Ultimate Fighting Championship male fighters